The Berber Socialism and Revolution Party (Berber: Akabar n Tagrawla d Tanemla Amazigh (KGNM), French: Parti de la Révolution et du Socialisme Berbère, PRSB) is a Berber political organization founded in 2000.

Official site
PARTI DE LA RÉVOLUTION ET DU SOCIALISME BERBÈRE

2000 establishments in Algeria
Berber political parties
Berberism in Algeria
Democratic socialist parties in Africa
Political parties established in 2000
Political parties in Algeria
Socialist parties in Algeria